Aquimarina gracilis  is a Gram-negative, strictly aerobic and slender rod-shaped bacterium from the genus of Aquimarina which has been isolated from the gut microflora from the mussel Mytilus coruscus which was collected from the Gwangyang Bay from the South Sea near Korea.

References

External links
Type strain of Aquimarina gracilis at BacDive -  the Bacterial Diversity Metadatabase

Flavobacteria
Bacteria described in 2013